Advantage may refer to:

 Advantage (debate), an argument structure in competitive debate
 Mechanical advantage, in engineering, the ratio of output force to input force on a system
 Advantage of terrain, in military use, a superiority in elevation over an opposing force
 Advantage (cryptography), a measure of the effectiveness of an enemy's code-breaking effort

Sport
 Advantage, in tennis terminology, when one player needs one more point to win the game
 Advantage in football and rugby; decision made by officials in a game not to stop play after a rule infringement, because the opposing side has a better position if play continues normally. See, for example, entries in glossaries of association football, rugby union, and rugby league terms

Arts and entertainment
 Advantage (film), a 1977 Bulgarian film
The Advantage : Why Organizational Health Trumps Everything Else in Business, book by Patrick Lencioni

Music
 Advantage (album), a 1983 post-punk album by the English band Clock DVA
 Advantage (band), an English brass rock band (fl. 2000s)
The Advantage (band)
The Advantage (album)

Ships
 HMS Advantage, one of three ships of the British Navy

Brands
 Advantage Database Server, a database product from Sybase iAnywhere
 Imidacloprid (Advantage or Advantage Flea Killer), a flea poison for pets
 Gillig Advantage, a low-floor transit bus
 Advantage, later known as Alpen Wheat Flakes, a breakfast cereal
 Advantage Rent a Car, a car rental company
 GP Advantage, a brand of printer paper owned by Georgia-Pacific
 NES Advantage, a joystick for the Nintendo Entertainment System
 Super Advantage, a joystick for the Super Nintendo Entertainment System